The Ming Cult is a fictional cult and martial arts school featured in the wuxia novel The Heaven Sword and Dragon Saber by Jin Yong, first published in serial form from 1961 to 1963. It is also briefly mentioned in The Legend of the Condor Heroes, another novel also by Jin Yong. It is loosely based on Manichaeism, an actual gnostic religion which originated in Persia in the 3rd century CE and later spread to other parts of the world, including China. The cult's headquarters is at Bright Peak in the Kunlun Mountains and it has several other bases spread throughout China. Its most powerful skills are the "Heaven and Earth Great Shift" and the "Martial Arts of the Holy Flame Tablets".

Background in the novel
In The Heaven Sword and Dragon Saber, the Ming Cult is also known as the "Cult of Mani" to martial artists in the jianghu but its more common name is "Mo Jiao", which literally means "Demonic Cult". The cult originated in Persia and spread to China in the seventh century.

The cult is secretive and conducts its activities far away from the eyes of other schools in the wǔlín ( "martial artists' community"). Its founding principles also deviate largely from other schools. While others typically seek to achieve a dominant position in the wǔlín, the Ming Cult strongly adheres to its faith and laws, which revolve around the notion of "delivering humankind from suffering and eliminating evil". This is aptly summed up in a mantra widely repeated by its members, which goes: 

The cult is actually a righteous school and not an evil cult as it is perceived in the wǔlín. Though it was welcomed during the Tang dynasty, it faces persecution later on by the government during the Song dynasty due to slanderous remarks made by its enemies in the imperial court. Apart from that, many martial artists and schools in the wǔlín who are unaware of the cult's real motives due to its conservative nature often speculate that it is inherently evil and start spreading rumors. The cult's image in society and in the wǔlín is adversely affected and marred, and it often struggles to survive in the face of powerful rivals who seek to destroy it.

During the Mongol-led Yuan dynasty, the Ming Cult starts a rebellion to overthrow the corrupt Yuan government and restore peace and order. However, its objective is not echoed by other schools and the common people; conversely, it faces hostility from them. The six leading orthodox schools in the wǔlín – Shaolin, Wudang, Emei, Kunlun, Kongtong and Mount Hua – form an alliance to attack the cult at its headquarters on Bright Peak.

The Ming Cult's newly elected leader, Zhang Wuji, resolves the conflict and opens the cult to the wǔlín for the first time. Views and attitudes towards the cult start to change for the better, and the cult earns strong support in its mission to topple the Yuan government. Zhang Wuji eventually passes the leadership of the Ming Cult to Yang Xiao and retires from the jianghu. Zhu Yuanzhang, a minor leader in the cult, betrays his fellows and unites all rebel factions in China under his control. He ultimately topples the Yuan dynasty, defeats his rivals such as Chen Youliang, and establishes the Ming dynasty.

Organisation
The cult is headed by its leader, called the jiào zhǔ. The Left and Right Bright Messengers serve as the leader's deputies. The cult also has four Guardian Kings who assist the leader in overseeing the cult's activities. Ranked below the Guardian Kings are the chiefs of the five banner divisions. The five divisions are each named after one of the Five Elements (Earth, Fire, Water, Wood, Metal). The cult's members are spread throughout these five banners. The cult has headquarters and bases spread throughout the land and are often disguised as ordinary buildings, such as inns and shops, to avoid identification by the government. The cult's main headquarters, called the zǒngtán, is based on Bright Peak in the Kunlun Mountains.

The Ming Cult's structure in Persia differs from the one in China. In Persia, the cult is led by a woman who is selected from three specially chosen virgins called "Holy Maidens". There are twelve Guardian Kings instead of four. The Three Messengers (Wind, Cloud and Moon) are tasked with safekeeping the Holy Flame Tablets, the cult's most sacred artifacts. They are also the most powerful in martial arts of all the cult's members in Persia.

Heaven and Earth Great Shift 
The "Heaven and Earth Great Shift" also translated into English as "Universal Grand Shift", is one of the Ming Cult's most powerful skills. It is also the signature skill of Zhang Wuji, the protagonist of The Heaven Sword and Dragon Saber. Zhang Wuji learns it in the forbidden area of the Ming Cult's headquarters at Bright Peak in the Kunlun Mountains, where the general altar of the Ming Cult in China is located.

The "Heaven and Earth Great Shift" originated from the Ming Cult of Persia, and is the most powerful skill in the Western Regions. It is a martial art handed down from generation to generation in the Ming Cult and only the leader of the cult is qualified to cultivate it. (Although Yang Xiao was allowed to study it for many years when he wasn't the undisputed leader).

The main purpose of the "Heaven and Earth Great Shift" is to reverse the two kinds of qi of Heaven and Earth, namely rigidity and softness, yin and yang, and the red colour of the cultivator's face indicates the sinking of blood and the transformation of true qi in the body.

Heavenly Eagle Cult
The Heavenly Eagle Cult was founded by one of the Ming Cult's Guardian Kings, "White Brows Eagle King" Yin Tianzheng. Yin left the Ming Cult in anger during its internal conflict and established his own school. The Heavenly Eagle Cult does not follow the Ming Cult's original practices and customs but its members are still morally disciplined. The Heavenly Eagle Cult is often regarded as a branch of the Ming Cult and deemed to be as equally evil and unorthodox in the wulin because of Yin Tianzheng's affiliation with the Ming Cult. The Heavenly Eagle Cult merges with the Ming Cult after Yin Tianzheng's maternal grandson, Zhang Wuji, becomes the new leader of the Ming Cult.

Connection to historical Manichaeism
The names Ming Jiao (literally "Religion of Light") and Moni Jiao (literally "Religion of Mani") were used in China during the Song dynasty to describe the faith practiced by Chinese adherents of Manichaeism such as the White Lotus.

Notes

Organizations in Wuxia fiction
Chinese Manichaeism
Condor Trilogy
The Heaven Sword and Dragon Saber

zh:摩尼教